Varilla may refer to:

Varilla (plant), a genus of plants in the family Asteraceae
Varilla, Kentucky

People with the name Varilla
Appuleia Varilla (fl. 17) the only daughter of Sextus Appuleius and Quinctilla, the sister of Publius Quinctillius Varus
Hay–Bunau-Varilla Treaty, signed on November 18, 1903, two weeks after Panama's independence from Colombia
Maurice Bunau-Varilla (1856–1944), French press magnate, proprietor of the newspaper Le Matin
Philippe-Jean Bunau-Varilla (1859–1940), French engineer and soldier

See also
Varillas, a surname